Emmanuel Bangué (born 21 July 1971 in Saint-Maur-des-Fosses) is a French long jumper, best known for finishing fourth at the 1996 Olympic Games. His personal best is 8.25 metres, achieved in September 1996 in Tomblaine.

Achievements

References

External links

1971 births
Living people
French male long jumpers
Athletes (track and field) at the 1996 Summer Olympics
Olympic athletes of France
Sportspeople from Saint-Maur-des-Fossés
Athletes (track and field) at the 1997 Mediterranean Games
Mediterranean Games competitors for France
21st-century French people
20th-century French people